Abhay Mahajan is an Indian actor known for his work in TVF drama series - Pitchers.

Life and career 
Mahajan completed his schooling from Abhinava Vidyalaya and graduated from Brihan Maharashtra College of Commerce. He started his career working as a child actor. He moved to Mumbai from Pune in 2015. Mahajan learnt body movement for a year at the Attakkalari Institute of Movement Arts (Bengaluru) and also conducts body movements workshop. He is also one of the founding members of the Pune-based theatre troupe, Natak Company. Mahajan has been active in theatre and has been part of many award-winning and acclaimed films. In 2018, he was part of Bharatiya Digital Party's Harry Potter spoof video, titled If Hogwarts was a Marathi School, where he played Hari Potdar.

Filmography

Films

Web series

References

External links

Year of birth missing (living people)
Living people
Indian male film actors
Marathi actors
Male actors in Marathi theatre